Petra Moroder  (born 3 July 1968) is an Italian freestyle skier. She was born in Bolzano. She competed at the 1992, 1994 and 1998 Winter Olympics in women's moguls.

References

External links 
 

1968 births
Living people
Sportspeople from Bolzano
Italian female freestyle skiers
Olympic freestyle skiers of Italy
Freestyle skiers at the 1992 Winter Olympics
Freestyle skiers at the 1994 Winter Olympics
Freestyle skiers at the 1998 Winter Olympics
Moroder family
20th-century Italian women
21st-century Italian women